Teunis Mulder may refer to:
Teun Mulder (born 1981), Dutch track cyclist
Tony Mulder (born 1955), Dutch-born Australian politician

See also
Mulder (surname)